The Fire Chief's Daughter is a 1910 silent film short directed by Francis Boggs and starring Kathlyn Williams. It was produced by the Selig Polyscope Company and released by the General Film Company.

Cast
Kathlyn Williams

References

External links
 The Fire Chief's Daughter at IMDb.com

1910 films
American silent short films
Lost American films
American black-and-white films
Selig Polyscope Company films
Silent American drama films
1910 drama films
1910s American films